John Schaeffer (born March 14, 1951) is an American sports and fitness trainer, author and nutritionist. He became the athletic trainer of Apolo Ohno in 2002. He specializes in sports conditioning (physical exercise), nutrition and weight management. He is a five time World Powerlifting and Superheavyweight Kickboxing Champion. He was also a co-owner of LJ's Fitness.

Fitness books by John Schaeffer
 The Winning Factor
 The Winning Factor For Women

References

American boxing trainers
1951 births
Living people